Stomachetosella is a genus of marine, filter-feeding invertebrates, known as bryozoa,  belonging to the order Cheilostomatida. The genus name derives from the Latin stoma, meaning "mouth," and ochetos, meaning "small canal."

Species
 Stomachetosella abyssicola Osburn, 1952
 Stomachetosella balani (O'Donoghue & de Watteville, 1944)
 Stomachetosella collaris (Kluge, 1946)
 Stomachetosella condylata Soule, Soule & Chaney, 1995
 Stomachetosella decorata Grischenko, Dick & Mawatari, 2007
 Stomachetosella distincta Osburn, 1952
 Stomachetosella limbata (Lorenz, 1886)
 Stomachetosella magniporata (Nordgaard, 1906)
 Stomachetosella normani Hayward, 1994
 Stomachetosella perforata (Canu & Bassler, 1929)
 Stomachetosella producta (Packard, 1863)
 Stomachetosella sienna Dick & Ross, 1988

References

Cheilostomatida